TF1 Séries Films, formerly HD1 (acronym for Histoire de) is a French TV channel, controlled by TF1 Group. HD1 launched on TNT, satellite, and xDSL on 12 December 2012.

History

Proposed new TNT channels
With the shutdown of analogue television, TF1 Group initially were to launch a new channel for Breton language channel TV Breizh, to be called 'tv-b'. However, Brussels ordered the sale of the new channel slots to the former analogue terrestrial companies, i.e. TF1 Group, Canal+ Group and M6 Group. The plans for TV Breizh were abandoned.

HD1
In March 2012, the Conseil supérieur de l'audiovisuel (CSA) auditioned TF1 Group following its application for an additional channel from one of the six national HD channels on TNT. TF1 Group chose the name 'HD1' "the network of all narratives".

On 27 March 2012, the CSA confirmed that HD1 would be one of the six HD channels. An agreement was signed 6 July 2012.

On 18 October 2017, TF1 Group announced that HD1 will change its name to TF1 Séries Films in 2018.

Visual identity

The initial HD1 logo first appeared during the hearing at CSA, on 14 March 2011. The logo was a circle with the text 'hd1' in the centre, the logo could be presented in various colours including red, light green, and blue.

However, in November 2012, A new logo was introduced before the launch of the channel. This new visual identity differs from the previous, the circle was removed and the text is now blue, with the 'HD' text now uppercase and as a ligature.

Programmes

Series  
 2 Broke Girls
 666 Park Avenue
 The A-Team
 Alarm für Cobra 11 – Die Autobahnpolizei
 Army Wives
 Brothers and Sisters
 Chase
 Clem
 Code barge
 Covert Affairs
 Doctor's Diary
 Downton Abbey
 Eastwick
 Eli Stone
 ER
 FlashForward
 The Forgotten
 Fritkot
 Gooische Vrouwen
 Gossip Girl
 Hollyoaks: l'amour mode d'emploi
 Julie Lescaut Karen Sisco Law & Order: LA Lipstick Jungle Miami Medical L'Hôpital House Pan Am Parenthood Paris enquêtes criminelles Privileged R.I.S, police scientifique Rosemary's Baby Seconde Chance Silk Stalkings Smash Sous le soleil Suburgatory 'Til Death V (2009)
 Who's the Boss? Telefilm 
 A.D. La guerre de l'ombre Au bas de l'échelle Facteur chance Hold-up à l'italienne Joseph L'Ombre du Mont-Saint-Michel Le Monsieur d'en face Les Fauves Ni vu, ni connu''

See also 
List of television stations in France

References

External links
 Official site 

Television stations in France
Television channels and stations established in 2012
French-language television stations